Christopher Mark Armstrong (born December 1964)  is a British economist, professor of economics at University College London and University Academic Fellow of All Souls College, Oxford. His research focuses on industrial organisation and the functioning of markets.

Education 
Armstrong graduated with a BA in mathematics from Queens' College, Cambridge in 1987. He was a postgraduate at St John's College, Oxford, from 1987 to 1992, where he received an M.Phil. and D.Phil. in economics.

Career 
Armstrong's first academic position was as a lecturer in microeconomics at Cambridge University and fellow of Gonville and Caius College, Cambridge. He left for a professorship in economic policy at the University of Southampton in 1994 and was appointed fellow of Nuffield College, Oxford, in 1997. He then became a professor of economics at University College London in 2003 and left for his current position at the University of Oxford in 2011.

The British Academy and the Econometric Society elected him to fellowship in 2007 and 2008, respectively. He is also a fellow of the European Economic Association.

He was managing editor and chair of the Review of Economic Studies and co-editor of the RAND Journal of Economics.

Selected works

References

External links 

 Official website
 Profile on the website of All Souls College, Oxford

Living people
1964 births
Fellows of All Souls College, Oxford
Fellows of Nuffield College, Oxford
Alumni of Queens' College, Cambridge
Alumni of St John's College, Oxford
British economists
Fellows of Gonville and Caius College, Cambridge
Fellows of the British Academy
Fellows of the Econometric Society
Fellows of the European Economic Association